Media may refer to:

Communication 
 Media (communication), tools used to deliver information or data
 Advertising media, various media, content, buying and placement for advertising
 Broadcast media, communications delivered over mass electronic communication networks
 Digital media, electronic media used to store, transmit, and receive digitized information
 Electronic media, communications delivered via electronic or electromechanical energy
 Hypermedia, media with hyperlinks
 Interactive media, media that is interactive
 Mass media, technologies that reach a large audience via mass communication
 MEDIA Programme, a European Union initiative to support the European audiovisual sector
 Multimedia, communications that incorporate multiple forms of information content and processing
 New media, the combination of traditional media and computer and communications technology
 News media, mass media focused on communicating news
 Print media, communications delivered via paper or canvas
 Published media, any media made available to the public
 Recording medium, devices used to store information
 Social media, media disseminated through social interactions

Arts, entertainment, and media
 Media (album), the 1998 album by The Faint
 Media, a 2017 American TV thriller film directed by Craig Ross Jr.
 List of art media, materials and techniques used by an artist to produce a work of art

Computing 
 Media player (software), for playing audio and video
 Storage media, in data storage devices

Life sciences 
 Media, a group of insect wing veins in the Comstock-Needham system
 Growth medium, objects in which microorganisms or cells can experience growth
 Media filter, a filter consisting of several different filter materials
 Tunica media, the middle layer of the wall of a blood vessel

Places

United States
 Media, Illinois
 Media, Kansas
 Media, Pennsylvania

Elsewhere
 Media (castra), a fort in the Roman province of Dacia
 Media (region), a region of and former empire based in north-western Iran
 Media, Africa, an Ancient city and former bishopric, now a Latin Catholic titular see in Algeria

Transport
 Media (automobile company)
 , a World War II US Navy ship that was never commissioned
 , a Cunard Line cargo liner in service 1948–61

See also 
 
 Medium (disambiguation)
 Medea (disambiguation)
 Midea (disambiguation)